In Greek mythology, Charidia was the nymph who bore Alchanus to Zeus, king of the gods.

Note

Reference 

 Pseudo-Clement, Recognitions from Ante-Nicene Library Volume 8, translated by Smith, Rev. Thomas. T. & T. Clark, Edinburgh. 1867. Online version at theoi.com

Nymphs
Divine women of Zeus